Roseanne Watt (born 1991) is a Scottish poet, filmmaker, and musician. She writes in both English and Shetland dialect. Her first poetry collection Moder Dy won multiple awards, including the Edwin Morgan Poetry Award in 2018 and the Somerset Maugham Award in 2020.

Biography
Roseanne Watt was born and raised in the Shetland Isles in Scotland. She attended the University of Stirling, where she earned a master's degree in English and film studies and later a PhD in creative writing and film. During her PhD studies,  she was supervised by poet Kathleen Jamie.
Watt's first poetry collection, Moder Dy was published by Polygon Books in 2019. The book is written in a mix of English and Shetland dialect.  "Moder Dy ('Mother Wave') refers to an undercurrent believed to run east from Foula, taking Shetland fishermen back home". Home is an important theme in the poetry collection.

As a filmmaker, Watt creates film poems which explore the language, literary traditions and landscape of Shetland. She is currently the poetry editor for the online literary journal The Island Review. She also performs in the bands Lukkie Minnine and Wulver, where she plays fiddle, vocals and guitar. She currently lives and works in Shetland.

Awards and recognition
 The Edwin Morgan Poetry Prize 2018, Moder Dy 
 Saltire Literary Award, Poetry Book of the Year 2019, Moder Dy, shortlist 
 The Highland Book prize 2019 Moder Dy, co-winner
 The Society of Authors Eric Gregory Award 2020, Moder Dy
 The Somerset Maugham Award 2020, Moder Dy

References

External links
Roseanne Watt: short films
Roseanne Watt's web page
 Scottish Language Center: Shetland

Shetland poets
Shetland writers
1991 births
People from Shetland
21st-century Scottish poets
Living people
Alumni of the University of Stirling